Then! is the second official live album by guitarist Allan Holdsworth, released in 2003 through Universal Music (Japan) and Alternity Records (US), then on 1 June 2004 through JMS–Cream Records (Europe). The recordings were taken from three consecutive concerts in Tokyo, Japan during May 1990.

Track listing

Personnel
Allan Holdsworth – guitar, SynthAxe, mixing, production
Steve Hunt – keyboard
Gary Husband – drums
Jimmy Johnson – bass
Robert Feist – engineering
Christopher Hoard – production, executive production
Derek Wilson – executive production

References

External links
In Review: Allan Holdsworth "Live - Then!" at Guitar Nine Records

Allan Holdsworth albums
2003 live albums